A by-election was held for the New South Wales Legislative Assembly electorate of Bondi on 6 November 1965 because Abe Landa resigned to accept the position of Agent-General for New South Wales in London. This position was usually a sinecure for retiring members of the ruling party but Premier Robert Askin offered it to Landa to force his resignation from parliament and cause a by-election with the hope of increasing his government's small majority. Landa's acceptance of the position resulted in his expulsion from the Labor Party.

Dates

Results

|- style="background-color:#E9E9E9"
! colspan="6" style="text-align:left;" |After distribution of preferences

Preferences were not distributed to completion.Abe Landa resigned to accept the position of Agent-General for New South Wales in London.

See also
Electoral results for the district of Bondi
List of New South Wales state by-elections

References

1965 elections in Australia
New South Wales state by-elections
1960s in New South Wales
November 1965 events in Australia